Club Deportivo Futuro Majes (sometimes referred as Futuro Majes) is a Peruvian football club, playing in the city of Majes, Caylloma, Arequipa, Peru.

History
The Club Deportivo Futuro Majes was founded on 2001.

In 2013 Copa Perú, the club classified to the Departamental Stage, but was eliminated when finished in 3rd place.

In 2014 Copa Perú, the club classified to the National Stage, but was eliminated by Fuerza Minera in the Round of 16.

In 2017 Copa Perú, the club classified to the Departamental Stage, but was eliminated by Los Chinitos de Atico in the First Stage.

In 2018 Copa Perú, the club classified to the Departamental Stage, but was eliminated by Social Corire in the First Stage.

In 2019 Copa Perú, the club classified to the National Stage, but was eliminated by Sport Chavelines in the Round of 32.

In 2021 Copa Perú, the club classified to the National Stage, but was eliminated by Alfonso Ugarte in the Fase 3 - Interregional.

Honours

Regional
Liga Departamental de Arequipa:
Winners (1): 2014
Runner-up (1): 2019

Liga Provincial de Caylloma:
Winners (1): 2019
Runner-up (4): 2013, 2014, 2017, 2018

Liga Distrital de El Pedregal - Majes:
Runner-up (1): 2014

See also
List of football clubs in Peru
Peruvian football league system

References

External links
 Futuro Majes: una historia por escribir

Football clubs in Peru
Association football clubs established in 1943
1943 establishments in Peru